Walter Percival Horace Stewart (15 April 1875 – 25 March 1926) was an  Australian rules footballer who played with St Kilda and Geelong in the Victorian Football League (VFL).

Notes

External links 

1875 births
1926 deaths
Australian rules footballers from Melbourne
St Kilda Football Club players
Geelong Football Club players
People from Prahran, Victoria